Lake Susan is a lake in Carver County, Minnesota, in the United States. It is 88 acres (36 hectares) in size and has a maximum depth of 17 feet (5 meters).

Lake Susan was named for Susan Hazeltine, a local schoolteacher; Hazeltine Lake is also named for her family.

See also
List of lakes in Minnesota

References

Lakes of Minnesota
Lakes of Carver County, Minnesota